The Hagamos Political Party (PPH) is a Paraguayan political party that was founded in March 2016.

Ideology 
The Hagamos Political Party defines itself as a centrist political platform, described as oriented "towards the construction of a pluralist, democratic and progressive state, oriented towards all social classes, but with special emphasis on youth".

History 
After its creation in 2016, the party filed candidacies in the 2018 general elections, winning two seats in the Senate and two seats in the Chamber of Deputies.

President 
 Patrick Kemper (currently)

References 

Political parties in Paraguay